Jane Remover (formerly known as dltzk; also known as leroy and other names) is an American music producer. They are most well known for their 2021 debut album, Frailty, as well as their pioneering of the "dariacore" microgenre on SoundCloud.

Biography 
Remover grew up with their parents and twin sister in northern New Jersey. They attended The College of New Jersey for one semester before leaving to pursue music full-time. They identify as a trans woman and use the pronouns they/she.

Career 
Remover's interest in music production stems back as far as 2011, inspired by dubstep producers like Skrillex, Kill the Noise, and Virtual Riot. They would later go on to produce different styles of EDM in the mid-2010s, citing Porter Robinson as their biggest influence. From electronic music, Remover's production became more trap-centric in around 2018; they cited artists such as Trippie Redd, Earl Sweatshirt, and Tyler, the Creator as inspirations. Guest production then became a large part of Remover's early career, with them being a member of multiple SoundCloud collectives such as PlanetZero and graveem1nd. Their production gradually became more digicore oriented.

In late 2019, Remover began self-producing and releasing their own works on SoundCloud. One of Remover's first solo releases, "what's my age again?", gained popularity after being shared on Twitter. Their second project, the extended play Teen Week, was released on  under the pseudonym dltzk. The track "Homeswitcher" reached 100,000 streams on SoundCloud within the first two weeks of its release.

After the release of several more one-off singles, Remover began teasing the release of their first full-length album, Frailty, and releasing singles for it in June 2021. The album was acclaimed by publications such as Pitchfork, who placed the album at #47 on their list of the best albums of 2021.

On , Remover announced the retirement of the dltzk pseudonym, and introduced the name Jane Remover. On the same date, they released the single "Royal Blue Walls". In Remover's statement, they said "the stage name dltzk has never sat right with [them]" and that it "reminds [them] of a period of [their] life [they'd] like to move past". They also announced that the Teen Week EP would be abridged, as they were uncomfortable with the project as it was originally released.

Other aliases 
Remover has released music under many pseudonyms throughout their career. The most notable of these aliases is leroy (used interchangeably with c0ncernn), under which they created sample-heavy EDM mashups. These releases sampled a wide range of sounds, including pop songs of the 2010s, viral videos, and even Remover's own music. The cover art for each song released under the leroy moniker were screenshots from the TV series Daria, which led to the term "dariacore" being used to describe the unique production style that Remover used for these releases. The "Dariacore" series of albums have since inspired many artists to adopt a similar style of production, releasing short sample-based EDM tracks themed around popular media.

Discography

Studio albums
As Jane Remover

As leroy

Extended plays

Singles

Remixes

References

Further reading
 https://pitchfork.com/news/jane-remover-shares-two-new-songs-listen/
 https://www.thefader.com/2022/11/17/song-you-need-jane-remover-contingency-song
 https://www.stereogum.com/2191489/jane-remover-royal-blue-walls-cage-girl/music/
 https://www.insider.com/dltzk-frailty-hyperpop-dariacore-digicore-soundcloud-rap-internet-musician-osquinn-2021-11
 https://www.thefader.com/2022/05/23/leroy-dariacore-3
 https://www.stereogum.com/2187594/leroy-dariacore-3%E2%80%8B-at-least-i-think-thats-what-its-called/music/

Breakcore
2003 births
Living people
Transgender women musicians